Thomas Lloyd King (born 9 March 1995) is a professional footballer who plays as a goalkeeper for EFL League Two club Northampton Town. He represented England at youth level and received his first call-up to the Wales squad in November 2019.

Club career

Millwall
King signed a one-year contract with Millwall in August 2014, having left the Crystal Palace youth team earlier in the season. 

He joined National League club Welling United on an initial one-month youth loan on 24 July 2015. He went on to make 20 appearances for the "Wings", before he was recalled by Millwall on 21 December.

King returned to the National League on 19 February 2016, joining Braintree Town for an initial 28-day emergency loan. In his second appearance in the club for a Guiseley at Nethermoor Park match, King became involved in a controversial incident during an 1–1 draw. He conceded the equalising goal after Oliver Norburn broke a fair play protocol and lobbed him from 30-yards out rather than passing the ball to him, after Braintree had kicked the ball into touch to allow an injured Braintree player to receive treatment; a five-minute fracas followed but the goal was allowed to stand after security staff separated the players and management, and Guiseley manager Mark Bower refused to allow Braintree to walk through and score. Bower went on to say: "Their keeper stood there with his arms in the air and allowed the ball to into the net. It put us in a really difficult position whether we should allow them to score or not but we decided no. I think their keeper was trying to be clever and had simply let the ball go in." King said he was "bewildered" by Bower's statement, and speaking on the incident itself said that: "It is one of those things that will be remembered for a long time, I'll be remembered for a long time and it will carry on forever". The incident was described as "one of the biggest on-field controversies seen in non-league football", and Braintree manager Danny Cowley said that: "it's the worst thing I've seen on a football pitch and it was disgraceful unsporting behaviour on their part". The following week, Guiseley chairman Phil Rogerson released a statement recognising the fair-play convention had not been followed: "... myself, Mark [Bower] and the club find the situation most regrettable and not in line with the general ethos of Guiseley AFC. Fair play is and always has been at the heart of the club. The decision to continue playing as normal after the goal was taken on the spur of the moment and under extreme pressure, not helped at all by the heated atmosphere." King went on to extend his loan at Cressing Road until the end of the 2015–16 season, and Braintree qualified for the play-offs, losing out to Grimsby Town at the semi-final stage following a 2–1 aggregate defeat.

King made his first team debut for Millwall in a 2–1 defeat to Nottingham Forest in an EFL Cup Second Round match at The Den on 23 August 2016.

King signed an 18-month contract extension with Millwall on 4 January 2018. On the same day, he joined League Two side Stevenage on loan for the rest of the 2017–18 season. King made his debut for Stevenage two days after signing, keeping a clean sheet in the club's 0–0 home draw with Reading in the Third Round of the FA Cup.

On 27 June 2018 King joined AFC Wimbledon on a season long loan. King started the season as first choice goalkeeper but soon fell behind the Dons reserve goalkeeper Joe McDonnell in the pecking order as the Dons struggled at the bottom of the table. His season-long loan was cut short when recalled by Millwall in January having started only 11 League games for the Dons, who had already replaced him with the loan of Aaron Ramsdale on loan from A.F.C. Bournemouth.

Newport County
On 7 June 2019, King joined League Two club Newport County on a two-year contract. On 3 August 2019 he made his debut for Newport in a 2–2 draw against Mansfield Town, saving a second half penalty. In September 2019, King was nominated for the August PFA League Two Player of the Month Award, after five successive clean sheets, and more than 500 minutes of football played without conceding for the South Wales side, who had climbed to second place in the league.

King scored the first goal of his career on 19 January 2021, with a wind-assisted goal kick in the 12th minute of Newport's 1–1 League Two draw at Cheltenham Town. King played for Newport in the League Two playoff final at Wembley Stadium on 31 May 2021 which Newport lost to Morecambe, 1–0 after a 107th-minute penalty. On 4 June 2021 it was announced that he would leave Newport County at the end of the 2020–21 season, following the expiration of his contract.

Salford City 
On 7 July 2021, Salford City confirmed that they had signed King on a two year deal.

Northampton Town 
On 14 January 2023, King signed for fellow League Two club Northampton Town on a six-month deal after agreeing a release from his Salford contract. Having been dropped for Alex Cairns, King's availability arrived at a good moment for Northampton due to an injury to Lee Burge.

International career
King was capped by England at under-16 and under-17 level. He also qualifies for Wales as his mother was born in Cardiff as well as being eligible for Gibraltar through residency, having spent several years there as a child, where he first started playing football in the youth ranks at Manchester United (Gibraltar).

On 7 November 2019, King was called-up in the Wales national football team for the first time for  the UEFA Euro 2020 qualifying matches against Azerbaijan and Hungary. In August 2021, following the withdrawal of Adam Davies due to a positive COVID-19 test, King was called-up in the squad for the September international fixtures; a friendly against Finland, and 2022 FIFA World Cup qualifiers against Belarus and Estonia.

Career statistics

Honours
Millwall
EFL League One play-offs: 2017

References

External links

1995 births
Living people
Footballers from Plymouth, Devon
English footballers
England youth international footballers
English people of Welsh descent
Association football goalkeepers
Portsmouth F.C. players
Crystal Palace F.C. players
Millwall F.C. players
Welling United F.C. players
Braintree Town F.C. players
Stevenage F.C. players
Newport County A.F.C. players
Salford City F.C. players
National League (English football) players
English Football League players
Manchester 62 F.C. players
Northampton Town F.C. players